Requiem is a 1995 narrative short film directed by actress Elizabeth Sung, made in the American Film Institute's Directing Workshop for Women.  Based on Sung's childhood in Hong Kong and her journey to New York City as a ballet student, it tells the story of a struggling dancer who loses a brother to AIDS.

The film won a CINE Golden Eagle Award in 1996.

Premise
A waitress/dancer remembers her loving brother and their bittersweet childhood in Hong Kong.

Cast
Tamlyn Tomita as Fong
Chris Tashima as Philip
Brenda Song as Young Fong
Binh Nguyen as Young Philip
Dana Lee as Father
Elizabeth Sung as Mother
Mary Chen as Hong Kong Teacher
Revel Paul as New York Teacher
Malcolm Moorman as Boyfriend

References

External links

1995 films
1995 short films
Films about Chinese Americans
American independent films
HIV/AIDS in American films
Films set in the 1980s
Films set in Hong Kong
American short films
Films scored by Christopher Franke
1995 independent films
1990s English-language films
1990s American films